André Cuneaz (born 1 June 1987) is an Italian footballer, who plays for VdA Saint-Christophe, in the Italian Lega Pro Seconda Divisione BC07.

Club career

Juventus
Cuneaz began his career with his hometown club Juventus F.C. in 2000. After working his way through the club's youth system, he joined the Primavera youth squad in 2006. Cuneaz was often called up to the first team during the 2006-07 season, but never made his league debut.

Cremonese & Pistoiese
In July 2007, Cuneaz was sold in a joint ownership agreement to U.S. Cremonese of Serie C1. Following his transfer, the young midfielder soon made his professional debut. However after that match he failed to play and left for Pistoiese. In June 2008, Juventus bought him back for a nominal fee of €500 and soon re-sold in another co-ownership agreement on 3 July 2008.

A.C. Mantova
Cuneaz was signed by A.C. Mantova on 3 July 2008, and in his first season with the Serie B outfit, he made 12 league appearances, and also made two Coppa Italia appearances. Despite a quiet first season at the club, the team directors opted to prolong the player's stay at the club for another season, after reaching an agreement with Juventus. In January 2010, Mantova and Juventus agreed on a loan deal for the young playmaker, after he made just four league appearances in the first portion of the 2009-10 Serie B season. During his six-month loan agreement with Taranto Sport, of the Italian Lega Pro Prima Divisione, Cuneaz made 12 league appearances. In June 2010, the co-ownership was resolved in favor of Juventus, and hence the player is owned outright by Juventus.

U.S. Alessandria
On 25 June 2010, Juventus resolved the co-ownership deal with A.C. Mantova in Juventus' favor. In July 2010, he was sold to U.S. Alessandria Calcio 1912 in a new co-ownership deal, in the Italian Lega Pro Prima Divisione. The following season, the transfer was made permanent. He has since made 31 league appearances for the club scoring 1 goal.

References

External links
 
 Calciatori.com Profile 

Italian footballers
Serie B players
Juventus F.C. players
U.S. Cremonese players
U.S. Pistoiese 1921 players
Mantova 1911 players
Taranto F.C. 1927 players
U.S. Alessandria Calcio 1912 players
Association football midfielders
Footballers from Turin
1987 births
Living people